Bomben auf Monte Carlo may refer to:

 Bomben auf Monte Carlo (novel), a 1930 novel
 Bombs on Monte Carlo (1931 film), a German film adaptation
 Captain Craddock, a 1931 French-language version
 Monte Carlo Madness, a 1932 English-language version
 Bombs on Monte Carlo (1960 film), a German film